Washington Township is one of the seventeen townships of Logan County, Ohio, United States. As of the 2010 census, the population was 3,605, down from 3,945 at the 2000 census.

Geography
Located in the western part of the county, it borders the following townships:
Richland Township - northeast
McArthur Township - east
Harrison Township - southeast
Pleasant Township - south
Bloomfield Township - west
Stokes Township - northwest

The village of Russells Point is located in northern Washington Township, and the unincorporated community of Lewistown lies in the township's center.

The southern part of Indian Lake is located in northern Washington Township.

Name and history
Washington Township was organized in 1839. It is one of 43 Washington Townships statewide.

On the shores of Dunns Pond (in northern Washington Township) is a Native American mound, the Dunns Pond Mound, which was built at some point between 300 BC and AD 600. The mound is listed on the National Register of Historic Places.

Government
The township is governed by a three-member board of trustees, who are elected in November of odd-numbered years to a four-year term beginning on the following January 1. Two are elected in the year after the presidential election and one is elected in the year before it. There is also an elected township fiscal officer, who serves a four-year term beginning on April 1 of the year after the election, which is held in November of the year before the presidential election. Vacancies in the fiscal officership or on the board of trustees are filled by the remaining trustees.

In the elections of November 2007, Rick Beck defeated Jeff Weidner in the election for the position of township trustee., while Lisa Miller was elected without opposition to the position of township fiscal officer.

Transportation
U.S. Route 33 is the most important highway in Washington Township.  Other significant highways in Washington Township include State Routes 47, 235, 274, 366, 368, 708, and 720.

References

External links

County website
County and township map of Ohio
Detailed Logan County map

Townships in Logan County, Ohio
Townships in Ohio
1839 establishments in Ohio
Populated places established in 1839